Citharomantis falcata is a species of praying mantis native to Sumatra and Borneo.  It is the sole member of its genus and is related to the genus Acromantis (Saussure, 1870).

See also
List of mantis genera and species

References

Mantodea genera
Acromantinae
Mantodea of Southeast Asia
Insects of Borneo
Insects of Indonesia
Fauna of Sumatra
Monotypic insect genera